is a Japanese sprinter who specialises in the 400 metres. She won the bronze medal in the women's 4 × 400 metres relay and mixed 4 × 400 metres relay at the 2019 Asian Championships. She also competed in the women's 4 × 400 metres relay at the 2019 World Relays. She is the former Japanese best record holder in the Mixed 4 × 400 metres relay (3:23.83 minutes).

Personal bests

Former Japanese best record holder

International competition

National titles
Japanese Championships
4 × 100 m relay: 2014, 2020
4 × 400 m relay: 2017, 2020

Notes

References

External links

Konomi Takeishi at Toho Bank 

1991 births
Living people
Fukushima University alumni
Sportspeople from Fukushima Prefecture
Japanese female sprinters